Donna Dubinsky is an American business leader who played an integral role in the development of personal digital assistants (PDAs) serving as CEO of Palm, Inc. and co-founding Handspring with Jeff Hawkins in 1995. Dubinsky co-founded Numenta in 2005 with Hawkins and Dileep George, based in Redwood City, CA. Numenta was founded to develop machine intelligence based on the principles of the neocortex. Dubinsky currently serves as CEO and board chair of Numenta. Dubinsky also serves on the board of Twilio (NYSE: TWLO). She served on the board of Yale University from 2006–2018, including two years as senior trustee.

Fortune nominated her, together with Hawkins, to the Innovators Hall of Fame, while Time named the pair as part of its Digital 50 in 1999 for their contribution to the development of the PDA.

Early years
Dubinsky grew up in Benton Harbor, Michigan, where her father, Alfred Dubinsky, worked as a scrap-metal broker. She later attended Yale University where, as a student in Jonathan Edwards College, she majored in history and earned her bachelor's degree in 1977. Dubinsky then worked for the Philadelphia National Bank before obtaining an MBA from Harvard Business School in 1981.

After graduating from Harvard Business School, she went to Apple Computer where she worked as a customer-support liaison. By 1985, she ran part of the company's distribution network.

In 1986, Bill Campbell recruited her to a senior position in Claris, a software subsidiary of Apple. Dubinsky was responsible for international sales and marketing, and within four years, her group was responsible for 50% of Claris's sales. However, Dubinsky decided to leave in 1991, when Apple did not allow Claris to become an independent company.

Palm, Inc. and Handspring
After a year's sabbatical in Paris to study French, Dubinsky met Jeff Hawkins through the introductions of Bill Campbell and Bruce Dunlevie. Hawkins was looking for a CEO to manage Palm, Inc.

In 1995, U.S. Robotics acquired Palm, Inc. for US$44 million. The first PalmPilot went on sale in April 1996. After a few months, sales started ramping quickly. In its first 18 months, more than one million PalmPilots had been sold. 3Com acquired U.S. Robotics, with its Palm subsidiary, in 1997.

Dubinsky, Hawkins, and Palm marketing manager Ed Colligan quickly became disillusioned with 3Com's plans for Palm, Inc. and left in June 1998 to found Handspring. Handspring became a leader in the market of smartphones with the Treo. The bursting of the dot-com bubble took its toll and Dubinsky lost her place on the Forbes 400 Richest Americans list in 2001. Furthermore, in 2003, Handspring merged with Palm, Inc. The company, formed through the merger was named palmOne. In 2005, palmOne was renamed to Palm, Inc., returning to its roots, and the independent PalmSource was acquired by Access Corporation of Japan.

Numenta
In March 2005, Donna Dubinsky, Jeff Hawkins and Dileep George, founded Numenta, Inc.  The company is based in Redwood City, California. Their goal is to create machine intelligence by developing theory based on the principles in the neocortex.

Numenta focuses on large-scale brain theory and simulation. Numenta researchers work with experimentalists and published results to derive an understanding of the neocortex. Their main research focus areas are cortical columns, sequence learning and sparse distributed representations. They have written a number of peer-reviewed journal papers and research reports on these topics.

Numenta is a technology provider and does not create go-to-market solutions for specific use cases. The company licenses their technology and application code to developers, organizations and companies who wish to build upon their technology. Numenta has several different types of licenses, including open source licenses, trial licenses and commercial licenses. Developers can use Numenta technology within NuPIC using the AGPL v3 open source license.

Harvard Alumni Achievement Award
On September 27, 2007, Donna Dubinsky was conferred the Harvard Business School's highest honor, the Alumni Achievement Award, by Dean Jay O. Light. The award was also given to: Ayala Corp. chair Jaime Augusto Zobel de Ayala, A. Malachi Mixon of Invacare, Sir Martin Sorrell of WPP Group and Hansjörg Wyss of Synthes. Dubinsky was cited for "introducing the first successful personal digital assistant (PDA) and who is now developing a computer memory system modeled after the human brain."

Other activities
Dubinsky was a trustee of the Computer History Museum in Mountain View, California. Several business school case studies have been written about her entrepreneurship. She is involved in philanthropy, and has written an op-ed in support of Obamacare.

References

External links
Five Key Lessons Learned as an Entrepreneur (44-min talk on 2005-02-12), Stanford Graduate School of Business
 Computer Resellers Industry Hall of Fame 1999 on Dubinsky, Hawkins and Colligan
 Fortune Magazine article on Dubinsky
 Time Digital 50 article on Dubinsky and Hawkins
 Fast Company article on Palm, Inc.
 Yale Alumni Magazine article on Dubinsky
 PalmOne board of directors
 Harvard Business School article on Dubinsky

1955 births
Apple Inc. employees
Living people
American computer businesspeople
Yale College alumni
Harvard Business School alumni
Palm, Inc.
Place of birth missing (living people)
Businesspeople from the San Francisco Bay Area
American technology chief executives
American women chief executives
21st-century American women